Svitek is a surname. Notable people with the surname include:

Louis Svitek, American musician and guitarist
Štefan Svitek (1960–1989), Czechoslovak murderer
Štefan Svitek (basketball) (born 1966), Slovak basketball player and coach
Vladimír Svitek (born 1962), Slovak ice hockey player
Will Svitek (born 1982), American football player

Slovak-language surnames